Hoya pandurata is a species of plant in the family Apocynaceae. It is endemic to China.

References

Flora of China
pandurata
Vulnerable plants
Taxonomy articles created by Polbot